Thomas Emanuel Ulimwengu (born 14 June 1993) is a Tanzanian footballer who plays as a striker for TP Mazembe and the Tanzania national football team.

Career

Youth career
Ulimwengu grew up in Dodoma, the Tanzanian capital, where he played for local club team Area C. At the age of 14 he was selected for the Dodoma Region U-17 team.  Soon after, he was selected through a nationwide talent search to join the first class of the Tanzania Soccer Academy, a joint project between the Tanzania Football Federation and British investors.

Ulimwengu impressed at the soccer academy and was soon called up to the Tanzania U-17 national team.  He was joint top scorer in the 2009 CECAFA U-17 Championship, in which Tanzania finished 2nd.  After his good performance in the competition, he was regularly called up by coach Marcio Maximo to practice with the senior national team, the Taifa Stars.

Club career
In the 2009–10 Tanzania Premier League season Ulimwengu played on-loan for Moro United.  The following summer, he represented Tanzania in the 2010 Copa Coca-Cola African Championship in South Africa, where he scored nine goals in five matches.

In July 2010 Thomas joined Swedish development outfit Athletic Football Club, with whom he competed in the Gothia Cup and Stockholm Cup. 

On 31 August 2011 Ulimwengu joined 4-time African Champions League winners TP Mazembe.  He scored in his debut, a 2–1 victory over Don Bosco.

International goals
Scores and results list Tanzania's goal tally first.

Honours
Al-Hilal Club
Sudan Premier League: 2018

References

External links

Official Website
Club profile
Daily News

1993 births
Algerian Ligue Professionnelle 1 players
Living people
Tanzanian footballers
Tanzania international footballers
Tanzanian expatriate footballers
Association football forwards
TP Mazembe players
Moro United F.C. players
JS Saoura players
AFC Eskilstuna players
Al-Hilal Club (Omdurman) players
FK Sloboda Tuzla players
2019 Africa Cup of Nations players
Tanzania youth international footballers
Tanzania under-20 international footballers
Expatriate footballers in the Democratic Republic of the Congo
Expatriate footballers in Algeria
Expatriate footballers in Sweden
Expatriate footballers in Bosnia and Herzegovina
Expatriate footballers in Sudan
Tanzanian expatriate sportspeople in the Democratic Republic of the Congo
Tanzanian expatriate sportspeople in Sweden
Tanzanian Premier League players